Sinosenecio, also butterweed, is a genus of Asian plants in the groundsel tribe within the daisy family. Most of the species are found only in China, with a few extending southward into Indochina.

 Species

 formerly included
see Tephroseris
 Sinosenecio koreanus - Tephroseris koreana  
 Sinosenecio newcombei - Tephroseris newcombei

References

Flora of China
Flora of Indo-China
Senecioneae
Asteraceae genera